Quintus Caecilius Metellus Celer (before 103 BC or c. 100 BC – 59 BC), a member of the powerful Caecilius Metellus family (plebeian nobility, not patrician) who were at their zenith during Celer's lifetime. A son of Quintus Caecilius Metellus Nepos, or, according to some, the son of tribune Quintus Caecilius Metellus Celer while the latter is the son of Quintus Caecilius Metellus Nepos, was an ancient Roman statesman and general during the First Century BC. He became consul in 60 BC and previously he held the offices of praetor (63 BC) and augur.

During the Third Mithridatic War (73-63 BC) against Mithridates VI of Pontus and Tigranes the Great of Armenia, Metellus Celer was a lieutenant (legate) of Pompey during his eastern campaigns (66-63 BC). In the winter of 66 BC Oroeses, king of the Caucasian Albanians attacked the forces of Pompey while they were celebrating the festival of the Saturnalia in their winter quarters in Lesser Armenia. Pompey had split his army into three divisions. Metellus Celer was in charge of one of them and custodian of Tigranes the Younger of Armenia. Metellus vigorously repulsed Oroeses while Flaccus and Pompey, who were in charge of the other two divisions, defeated the other Albanians.

During Metellus Celer's praetorship in 63 BC, Titus Labienus indicted an old backbench Optimate senator, Gaius Rabirius, for the murder of Lucius Appuleius Saturninus thirty-six years earlier. Saturninus had been opposed by the consuls of the time at the direction of the senate. Thus, with the proposed trial the senate would lose the authority to enforce its decrees. Acts which had received the approval of the senate and had been committed many years earlier tended to give immunity to those who tried to repeat the conduct of Saturninus and make punishment of such acts ineffective. The senate was outraged that an innocent elderly man of senatorial rank was attacked and that the tribunes were entrusted with the control of affairs. There were pro- and anti-prosecution factions. The former won through the support of Julius Caesar, who was the judge together with Lucius Julius Caesar, and Rabirius was charged. The judges had been unlawfully chosen by the urban praetor, Lentulus Sura, instead of the people. Rabirius appealed and would have been convicted by the people, but this was prevented by Metellus by obstructing the meeting of the assembly of the people.

In 63 BC, when the Catilinarian Conspiracy was discovered, Catiline, its leader, was indicted for violence. He went to stay at the house of Metellus Celer to allay suspicions as Metellus was the praetor, but was unsuccessful. Metellus then brought several conspirators to trial by virtue of a decree of the senate and imprisoned them. Cicero entrusted matters outside Rome to Metellus Celer. He was sent to the district of Pisa (in Etruria) with three legions. On learning that the rebels were advancing towards Pistoia to flee to Cisalpine Gaul (in northern Italy) he encamped at the foot of the mountain from which they had to descend for their passage to Cisalpine Gaul, while the consul Antonius had his troops at their rear. He besieged Faesulae (Fiesole), the base of Catiline, together with Antonius. The two men were encamped in two different places. Catiline attacked Antonius instead of Metellus, even through the former had a larger army. References to Metellus Celer during the conspiracy were also made by Cicero and Valerius Maximus.

In 62 BC, Celer's brother, Quintus Metellus Nepos, challenged the legality of Cicero's actions in dealing with the Catiline conspiracy. Celer, who was serving as governor of Cisalpine Gaul, wrote in support of Cicero. The charge was dismissed.

When he was consul in 60 BC, Metellus Celer sided with the Optimates and vigorously opposed Pompey in everything because he had divorced his sister. Together with Cato the Younger he was the main opponent of the ratification of the acts Pompey had made with the cities and kingdoms in Asia as a result of the Mithridatic War. He also opposed an agrarian bill proposed by Flavius, a plebeian tribune, which Pompey sponsored and which was intended to give land grants to Pompey's discharged soldiers which they were entitled to.  Metellus led the opposition to the agrarian bill. He contested every point of Flavius' bill and attacked him so persistently that the plebeian tribune had him put in prison. Metellus wanted to convene the senate there and Flavius sat at the entrance of the cell to prevent this. Metellus had the wall cut through to let them in. When Pompey heard this he was afraid of the reaction of the people and told Flavius to desist. Metellus did not consent when the other plebeian tribunes wanted to set him free.

In 59 BC, Metellus Celer and Cato the Younger for a time refused to swear obedience to the agrarian law of Julius Caesar, who was consul in that year. Eventually they complied.

Metellus Celer was married to his cousin Clodia Quadrantaria, the daughter of Appius Claudius Pulcher and sister of Publius Clodius Pulcher. They had a daughter named Caecilia Metella, like all the women in the family of the Caecilii Metelli. Celer's reputation was dogged by the scandals attached to Clodia. A contemporary poem by Catullus "may refer to Celer's marital ineffectiveness and obtuseness".  The couple were known for their blazing public rows.

Quintus Caecilius Metellus Celer died suddenly in 59 BC—according to some poisoned by his wife, who was notoriously debauched, reputed to be the incestuous lover of her brother Clodius, of Caelius, possibly of the great lyric poet Catullus (most authorities identify her as the subject of his Lesbia), and many others.

Notes

References

Sources
Primary sources
 Cassius Dio, Roman History, Vol. 3, Books 36–40, Loeb Classical Library, Loeb, 1989; 
 Henry G. Hohn, The Life and Letters of Marcus Tullius Cicero, London, England, 1848, pg. 334.
 Sallust, Catiline's Conspiracy, The Jugurthine War, Histories, Oxford World's Classics, Oxford University Press, 2010; 

Secondary Sources
 T. P. Wiseman, "Celer and Nepos", Classical Quarterly vol. 1 (1971), p. 180—182
 Peter V. Jones and Kenneth C. Sidwell, The World of Rome: an introduction to Roman culture, Cambridge University Press, 1997, p. 104.
 Erich S. Gruen, The Last Generation of the Roman Republic, University of California Press, 1995, pp. 58, 130.

100s BC births
59 BC deaths
1st-century BC Roman augurs
1st-century BC Roman consuls
1st-century BC Roman praetors
Celer, Quintus
Optimates
Year of birth uncertain